Amrui (also Romanized as ‘Amrū’ī; also known as Amruni and Imrūni) is a village in Ayask Rural District, in the Central District of Sarayan County, South Khorasan Province, Iran. At the 2006 census, its population was 329, in 74 families.

References 

Populated places in Sarayan County